The giant African threadfin (Polydactylus quadrifilis) is a species of ray-finned fish from the threadfin family Polynemidae. It is found in the eastern Atlantic Ocean off the west coast of Africa.

Description
It has a pointed snout and analmost straight dorsal profile on the head. It has two separate dorsal fins, the first dorsal fin has 8 spines with the second of these being thicker than the rest, and the second dorsal fin contains a single spine and 13 soft rays. The anal fin has 3 spines and 11 soft rays, its base approximately equal in length to the base of the second dorsal fin. The pectoral fin has 12 or 13 unbranched rays and it measures 20 to 24% of the standard length of the fish, its tip not extended as far as the tip of pelvic fin. There are 4 pectoral filaments with the first being the shortest, the first three filaments extend past the origin of the pelvic fin but not as far as its tip. The fourth pectoral filament is the longest, being  27 to 39% of the standard length, reaches at least to the tip of the pelvic fin. The caudal fin is deeply forked and has  lobes non-filamentous long lobes. There are 70*71 pored scales in the lateral line which is simple and runs from the upper end of the gill slit to the upper end of the lower lobe of the caudal fin. The head and upper flanks are silver with a blackish tint, paler on the lower flanks and white on the breast and belly. The snout is semi-transparent. The dorsal fins and caudal fin are pale with blackish rear margins. The pectoral fin is bright yellow and the pectoral filaments are white. The pelvic and anal fins are dusky with white on the front edge and at their bases.

Distribution
The giant African threadfin occurs in the tropical eastern Atlantic Ocean off the coast of western Africa from Senegal to Congo. There is a single record from Mauritania.

Habitat and biology
The giant African threadfin is found in shallow coastal waters where there are sandy and muddy bottoms and is occasionally recorded in brackish waters. It will enters estuaries and is rarely taken in fresh water but the largest individuals are only recorded from marine waters. This carnivorous fish east crustaceans and fishes.

Fisheries
The giant African threadfin is a highly sought after species for commercial and sport fisheries.

Species description
The giant African threadfin was first formally described by Georges Cuvier in  Histoire naturelle des poissons. Tome troisième. Suite du Livre troisième. Des percoïdes à dorsale unique à sept rayons branchiaux et à dents en velours ou en cardes co-authored with Achille Valenciennes. The name Cuvier gave it was Polynemus quadrifilis and the type locality was given as Senegal.

References

Giant African threadfin
Fish described in 1829
Taxa named by Georges Cuvier